Canada's role in the development of peacekeeping during the 20th century led to the reputation as a prominent world power. Canada's commitment to multilateralism has been closely related to peacekeeping efforts. Canadian Nobel Peace Prize laureate Lester B. Pearson was the father of modern United Nations Peacekeeping. Prior to Canada's role in the Suez Canal Crisis, Canada was viewed by many as insignificant in issues of the world's traditional powers. Canada's successful role in the conflict gave Canada credibility and established it as a nation fighting for the common good of all the world's nations and not just their allies. Since 1995, however, Canadian direct participation in United Nations peacekeeping efforts has greatly declined. That number decreased largely because Canada began to direct its participation to UN-sanctioned military operations through NATO, rather than through the UN. In July 2006, for instance, Canada ranked 51st on the list of UN peacekeepers, contributing 130 peacekeepers out of a total UN deployment of over 70,000; whereas in November 1990 Canada had 1,002 troops out of a total UN deployment of 10,304.

Below is a list of major peacekeeping missions undertaken by Canada from 1956 to present.



See also

 History of Canadian foreign policy
Canadian military victories
List of Canadian military operations
List of conflicts in Canada
Military history of Canada
Peacekeepers' Day
Canadian Peacekeeping Service Medal

References

Further reading 

 
National Defence Headquarters (1995) Peacekeeping 1815 to Today National Defence, Ottawa (Downloadable PDF)

External links 
 Canada and UN Peacekeeping – United Nations Association in Canada

Peacekeeping Missions
Peacekeeping
Peacekeeping Missions
Peace
Peacekeeping